The El Carrizo deer mouse (Peromyscus ochraventer) is a species of rodent in the family Cricetidae. It is found only in Mexico.

References

Musser, G. G. and M. D. Carleton. (2005). Superfamily Muroidea. pp. 894–1531 in Mammal Species of the World a Taxonomic and Geographic Reference. D. E. Wilson and D. M. Reeder eds. Johns Hopkins University Press, Baltimore.

Peromyscus
Mammals described in 1851
Taxa named by E. C. Stuart Baker
Taxonomy articles created by Polbot
Endemic mammals of Mexico
Veracruz moist forests